Orel State University or Turgenev State University of Oryol, officially Orel State University named after I.S. Turgenev (OSU; , Orlovskiy gosudarstvenniy universitet imeni I.S. Turgeneva; often abbreviated ОГУ, OGU), formerly Oryol State Pedagogical Institute, is a university in Central Federal district of Russia in the city Oryol (or Orel) which is the Administrative centre of Oryol Oblast (or Orel region). OSU opened in 1931 as Industrial-Pedagogical Institute. Today OSU is a member of Association of the Classical Universities of Russia.

History 
Orel Proletarian University named after V.I. Lenin was created on October 31, 1918 by the Decree of the Department of Public Education of the Orel Provincial Committee and which was opened on November 5 of the same year and existed in Oryol until 1920.

The Board of the Orel Province Education Committee on March 19, 1920 passed the resolution "On the reorganization of the Orel proletarian university" and on the establishment of Orel State University on its base and the Institute of Public Education.

The Council of People's Commissars on November 4, 1921 has adopted a decree to establish a Higher Pedagogical Institute on the basis of OSU. Its formal opening ceremony took place on October 9, 1921. However, the further course of the country's leadership on the specialization of higher education led to the decision of November 15, 1922 on the closure of the Orel Higher Pedagogical Institute. The students were transferred to other universities and technical schools, and the teaching staff of the university moved to work at Orel Pedagogical and Mechanical-Building Technical School.

In 1927 there were created groups for the training of engineers in the Mechanics and Construction Technical College in parallel with the groups for the training of specialists with secondary education. On August 5, 1931 Industrial and Pedagogical Institute was founded in Oryol by the decree of the Council of People's Commissars of the Russian SFSR. Its formal opening ceremony was held on October 16, 1931. It consisted of four faculties (physical and technical, chemical and biological, socio-economic (literary-social, polytechnic). In 1932 the Workers' Faculty and Evening Institute was opened at the OSPI (until 1938). In January 1933 Belgorod Pedagogical Institute was consolidated with OSPI.

Since 1934 (September 1) there were two Institutes  (Teacher's Institute with two-year term of training and Pedagogical Institute, with four-year term of training which trained teachers for secondary schools) in the structure of OSPI. In the period of retention of this structure until 1952, University was called Orel State Pedagogical and Teachers' Institute, keeping the name Orel Pedagogical Institute in the press and internal turnover documents. The Workers' Faculty and Model School (until 1949) were founded in the framework of the OSU in 1920.

In 1940 the first two volumes of "Orel State Pedagogical Institute Transactions" on Natural Science and Chemistry and on Physics and Mathematics were published.

Further development of the OSPI was determined by the Great Patriotic War. In June 1941 200 students and teachers left the Institute for the front.

On August 23, 1941 by the order of the People's Commissariat of Education of the RSFSR OSPI was evacuated to Birsk in the Bashkir ASSR, where the teacher's technical school was created by the Birsk State Pedagogical Institute, which retained the structure of the Orel Pedagogical Institute.

On November 20, 1943 by order of the Council of People's Commissars of the RSFSR OSPI was re-evacuated to Yelets, and in August 1944 returned to Oryol.

In 1945 the first post-war collection of "Orel State Pedagogical Institute Transactions" was published, in the same year the first thesis for the degree of Doctor of Sciences (Y.Y. Tseeb) was defended in the university.

In 1952 Teacher’s institute of Orel Pedagogical and Teacher's Institute was closed, and it was renamed Orel State Pedagogical Institute.

In 1954 the first postgraduate study in the history of the OSPI was started at the Russian Language Department. In the same year the Evening Department was opened. In the same year on February 26 the technical education in Oryol acquired the form of higher education. Orel UKP was established in the structure of the All-Union Correspondence Engineering Institute (VZMI). On November 30, 1960 on its basis the General Technical Department (GTD) of the VZMI was created. On June 29, 1962 in the GTD of VZMI   full-time form of education was introduced, and on June 6, 1966 it was transformed into the Orel branch of the VZMI.

On November 6, 1981 by Decree of the Supreme Soviet of the USSR OSPI was awarded the Order of the Badge of Honor.

On April 21, 1988 the Orel Branch of VZMI was reorganized into the Orel Branch of the Moscow Institute of Instrument Engineering (OB MIIE), on May 17, 1993 into Orel State Polytechnic Institute, and on March 14, 1995 Orel State Polytechnic Institute was renamed the Orel State Technical University.

In 1994 OSPI received the status of the Pedagogical University (Orel State Pedagogical University, OSPU) and in 1996 was transformed into a classical university. On June 6 of the same year Educational and Research and Production Complex (UNPK) was created on the basis of Orel State Technical University.

In 2002 the Government of the Russian Federation Award in the field of education for scientific and practical development for educational institutions of higher professional education "Improving the quality of engineering and technological education on the basis of continuity and interuniversity integration of scientific schools of engineering technologists" was awarded to a group of employees of Orel STU. In 2003 the creative team of the university was awarded the Presidential Prize in the field of education for scientific and practical development for the system of professional education and scientific and innovative infrastructure of the regions "University Educational-Scientific Production Complex as the Basis for the Development of Education, Economics and Social Sphere of the Region".

On November 25, 2010 Orel State Technical University was renamed State University - Educational-Research and Production Complex, and in 2015 it was renamed Prioksky State University.

In the same year the decision of the Government of the Russian Federation was taken to establish  Key University in Orel region, in accordance with which in 2016 (April 1), the Orel State University named after I.S. Turgenev was established on the basis of tow Universities as Key institution.

Oryol State University Today 

Orel State University named after I.S. Turgenev is the first Key University in Russia; the only multidisciplinary center in the region that conducts continuous training of specialists of all levels in the field of pedagogical, engineering, medical, natural-science and humanities education.

To date, the structure of the university is represented by 3 branches (Karachev, Livny and Mtsensk), 12 institutes and 13 faculties. This is 297 educational programs and more than 940 doctors and candidates of science teaching. About 19,000 students from 55 countries study at our University; more than 4,000 students are graduated annually. Almost the third of the students graduate with an honors degree. The university consists of:

 Center for Attracting Talented Youth;
 Center for Advanced Continuing Education;
 Center for Innovative Development of the Region.

Key University is also the center of socio-cultural development of the region. For this purpose there were created the following:

 The regional acceleration program for the development of voluntary initiatives - acceleration, consolidation, support and conversion of voluntary initiatives.
 Center for literary heritage: "Turgenev's language is the language of the world" for the promotion of the literary heritage of I.S. Turgenev.
 Agropedinstitute - preparation of rural school teacher.
 Association “A House of Gentlefolk” as the core of social initiatives - the creation of social, educational and cultural services.

The university's ecosystem is innovative one and includes:

 University clinic;
 Center for Collective Use of Scientific Equipment;
 Center for Interdisciplinary Studies;
 Business incubator;
 Center for Technology Transfer and Commercialization;
 Technology and Innovation Support Center;
 Translation Bureau;
 Center for Publicity Activity;
 Project office.

Specialized research schools for youth are the project that is aimed at creating a new model of additional education for the younger generation, able to work in future in high technology and high-tech industries:

 School of Robotics;
 School of Nanotechnology and Nanochemistry;
 School of the Young Architect;
 School of Biotechnology;
 School of Electronics and Instrumentation;
 School of the Young Entrepreneur.

Membership of the university and individual scientists in specialized associations:

 The CDIO / CDIO Initiative
 International Association for Continuing Education;
 Network of language partners of the French Embassy;
 Association of Foreign Students of Russia;
 Association of Russian-Azerbaijani Universities.

Academic Mobility Programs:

 Erasmus Mundus;
 Jean Monnet;
 DAAD.

The OSU is a comfortable environment for life, work and study:

 University campus (16 academic buildings and 9 student hostels);
 Student polyclinic;
 University clinic;
 Network of meal service objects;
 Fitness and sports complex;
 Swimming pool and indoor ice skating rink;
 Leisure center «Zelenyy Bereg».

The university also created all the conditions for developing the formative and creative potential of students:

 Regional Headquarters of Russian Students’ Teams;
 Center for Culture and Aesthetic Education;
 Center for History and Exposition Activities;
 The Joint Council of Students;
 Trade Union Organization of Students.

Students of the OSU lead an active creative and sports life. At the university there are various theatrical, vocal and dance studios, as well as 20 sports sections.

Sport is an integral part of student life. It includes sports teams of the university on football, mini-football, basketball, volleyball, and work with individual athletes. Women’s mini-football team, men's football team, women's basketball team and men's volleyball team achieved high results in sports.

Many significant events took place during the existence of Key University:

 The university crossed over to education with CDIO approach.
 OSU named after I.S. Turgenev became the base for the Regional Competition of the Working Professions "Young Professionals" (WorldSkills Russia) of the Orel Region.
 Our University became a platform for the basketball competition “Match of Stars ASB 2017” in Oryol.
 OSU named after I.S. Turgenev became the organizer of the Workout Championship among universities.
 The University Clinic was opened. It is the structural subdivision of the OSU named after I.S. Turgenev.
 Our University is regularly visited by foreign teachers and scientists for lecturing.

Students of Key University become winners and prize-winners not only of regional and all-Russian Olympiads, but also international ones. They take part in various international conferences, such as:

 Participation in the International Conference on Photonics "European Conference on Biomedical Optics" (Munich, Germany);
 Participation in the II International Conference "Tourism Dynamics and Trends" (University of Seville, Spain).
 Participation in the Summer School on Photonics and Optics (Oulu, Finland)

In addition, Key higher educational institution itself becomes a venue for international conferences and seminars:

 Seminar on the international Erasmus+ programme and academic mobility;
 International scientific and practical conference on the basis of the Institute of Economics and Management, etc.

The university is visited by foreign delegations from all over the world: France, United States, Iran, Vietnam, Armenia and others.

Departments 
OSU has 12 institutes and 13 faculties:

 Law Institute;
 Architectural and Construction Institute;
 Institute of Instrument Engineering, Automation and Information Technologies;
 Institute of Natural Sciences and Biotechnology;
 Institute of Correspondence and Part-Time Education;
 "Academy of Physical Culture and Sports" Faculty;
 Polikarpov Polytechnic Institute;
 Faculty of Secondary Vocational Education;
 Faculty of Pre-University Education and Career Guidance;
 Faculty for Foreign Students’ Training;
 Faculty of Higher Qualification Expert Training;
 Faculty of Physics and Mathematics;
 Faculty of Philosophy;
 Institute of Philology;
 Social Faculty;
 Institute of Pedagogy and Psychology;
 Medical Institute;
 Medical Faculty;
 Faculty of Pediatrics, Dentistry and Pharmacy;
 Art and Graphic Faculty;
 Faculty of Technology, Entrepreneurship and Service;
 Institute of Foreign Languages;
 Faculty of History;
 Center for Continuing Professional Education and Upgrade Training;
 Institute of Economics and Management.

Degree mill 
According to the investigation by Dissernet the university has awarded numerous (>85) degrees based on heavily plagiarised theses. On April 18, 2011, An anticorruption body was formed at Oryol state university called Turgenev and it follows a professional code of ethics which was approved on the 25th of December 2014 in an effort to fight against corruption.

References

External links 
 Official Russian site of Oryol State University
 Official English site of Oryol State University
 Information about OSU

Oryol
Education in the Soviet Union
Universities in Russia
Educational institutions established in 1931
Buildings and structures in Oryol Oblast
1931 establishments in the Soviet Union